This is a list of men's college soccer programs in the United States, that play in NCAA Division I. As of the most recently completed 2022 NCAA Division I men's soccer season, 208 schools in the United States sponsored Division I varsity men's soccer; 203 of these schools are full Division I members, four (Bellarmine, Merrimack, UC San Diego, and Utah Tech [formerly Dixie State]) were in transition from Division II to Division I, and one (St. Thomas) is transitioning from Division III.

This list reflects each team's conference affiliation as of the coming 2023 season.

Current Division I schools

Notes

See also 
 College soccer
 List of NCAA Division I women's soccer programs
 List of NCAA Division II men's soccer programs
 List of NCAA Division II women's soccer programs
 List of soccer clubs in the United States

References 

United States
Soccer clubs
NCAA Division I soccer